David Hewitt McRobbie is an Australian writer of television, radio and children's literature.

Biography
McRobbie was born in Glasgow, Scotland in 1934. In 1958 he moved to Australia and worked as a teacher in the 1960s in Papua New Guinea. He is currently a full-time writer but has previously worked as a television and radio producer, a ship's engineer, and a college lecturer. McRobbie's first published work was in 1976 with a collection of stories, entitled Talking Tree and Other Stories. In 1991 he started writing the series of Wayne which he adapted in 1996 into a television series entitled The Wayne Manifesto. In 2000 he created the television series Eugenie Sandler P.I. and was short-listed for the Children's Book Council of Australia Book of the Year Award for older readers for his novel, Tyro. In 2002 his novel Mum, Me, and the 19th C was a finalist for the Aurealis Award for best young-adult novel.

List of Works

Novels
Wayne series
The Wayne Manifesto (1991)
Waxing with Wayne (1993)
The Wayne Dynasty (1993)
The Wages Of Wayne (1994)
Wayne in the Wings (1994)
A Whole Lot of Wayne (2008)

Other novels
Punch Lines (1987)
Head Over Heels (1990)
The Fourth Caution (1991)
This Book Is Haunted (1993)
Timelock (1993)
Mandragora (1994)
Prices (1995)
See How They Run (1996)
Mum, Me, the 19c (1999)
Tyro (1999)
Eugenie Sandler P.I. (2000)
Fergus Mcphail (2001)
Mum, Me, and the 19th C (2002)
Strandee (2003)
Mad Arm of the Y (2005)
Vinnie's War (2011)

Collections
Talking Tree and Other Stories (1976)
Flying with Granny and Other Stories (1989)

Short fiction
"Album" (1995) in Dark House (ed. Gary Crew)

Source: Fantastic Fiction, ISFDB

Television
The Wayne Manifesto (1996–1997) writer of 26 episodes, adapted from the Wayne series
See How They Run (1999) adapted from McRobbie's 1996 novel See How They Run
Eugenie Sandler P.I. (2000) creator and writer
Fergus McPhail (2004) creator and writer of 26 episodes

Source: IMDB

Nominations
Aurealis Awards
Best young-adult novel
2002: Nomination: Mum, Me, and the 19th C
two children's awards from the school of the arts sydney
Children's Book Council of Australia Book of the Year Award
Older Readers
2000: Nomination: Tyro

References

1934 births
Australian children's writers
Living people
Scottish emigrants to Australia
Writers from Queensland